Xavier Roger Perrot (1 February 1932 – 8 December 2008) was a Swiss racing driver and garage owner, who won the European Hill Climb Championship in 1972. He had previously competed in Formula Two and drove his Brabham in the Formula Two class of the 1969 German Grand Prix.

Career
After participating in national-level motorsport as a driver and rallying co-driver, Perrot began racing in hillclimbing in the early 1960s, campaigning cars such as a Lotus 23 and an Abarth-Simca. In 1968 he switched to Formula Two, driving a Brabham BT23C, and after a difficult first season, improved in 1969. He finished fourth in a non-championship race at Hockenheim and sixth in the Formula Two class of the German Grand Prix at the Nürburgring, and was classified tenth overall.

In 1970 Perrot campaigned a March 702, the first customer car sold by the company. With this car, he won the Preis von Deutschland Formula Two event at the Nürburgring. He continued in Formula Two in 1971 with a March 712M, finishing third at Imola, while also making a successful return to hillclimbing. He won the European Hill Climb Championship in 1972 using a March 722 F2 car, winning six events. He also raced this car occasionally in Formula Two, scoring points in three races, including fourth and fifth places in events at Hockenheim, and was classified 13th in the championship.

Although Perrot raced in the Formula Two class of a World Championship Formula One event, he never raced in a full Formula One World Championship race. He did however drive Jo Siffert's ex-works March 701 in the non-Championship 1971 Jochen Rindt Memorial Trophy race at Hockenheim, where he finished 11th.

Perrot retired in 1973 to concentrate on his garage business in his hometown of Zurich, where he died after a long illness in 2008, aged 76.

Racing record

Complete Formula One World Championship results
(key)

Complete Formula One non-championship results
(key)

Complete European Formula Two Championship results
(key)

References

 "Motorsport Memorial" 
 The Grand Prix Who's Who, Steve Small, Guinness Publishing, 1996.

Swiss racing drivers
Swiss Formula One drivers
European Formula Two Championship drivers
1932 births
2008 deaths
Sportspeople from Zürich